Brooklands is an area of Greater Manchester, England,  southwest of Manchester city centre. It had a population of 24,796 at the 2011 census (10,434 in Trafford and 14,362 in Manchester).

History 
The area is named after Samuel Brooks, a Manchester banker and businessman who, in 1856, bought a parcel of land in this area from the Earl of Stamford; he also made further purchases later.

Transport links
The area was crossed by the Manchester, South Junction and Altrincham Railway, which opened in 1849. A road crossed this railway between Sale and Timperley stations, and in 1855, 45 residents petitioned for a station there. The company took no action but in 1859, Brooks negotiated terms for a station. He offered an acre of land for £200 with a guarantee of compensation if it did not pay. The unofficial name Brooks's land soon became Brooklands, and the station so named opened there on 1 December 1859.

The Manchester Metrolink tram network passes through the district; Brooklands Station lies on the route between Manchester city centre and Altrincham.

In 1862, Brooks built a private road running southeast from the station, with land for superior housing. This ran (and still runs) all the way to the A538 Altrincham–Wilmslow road at Hale, making use of the earlier Roaring Gate Lane for part of the journey.

Governance 

The area elects three councillors to Trafford Metropolitan Borough Council via its Trafford ward, currently Chris Boyes and David Hopps of the Conservative Party and Steven Longden of the Labour Party.

It also elects three councillors to Manchester City Council via its Manchester ward. Currently, all three councillors, Sue Murphy (also Council Deputy Leader), Sue Cooley, and Glynn Evans are members of the Labour Party.

Both wards are represented in Westminster by Mike Kane MP for Wythenshawe and Sale East.

Brooklands cemetery
Some notable individuals who are buried in Brooklands cemetery are:
 James Joule a notable English physicist, who lent his name to the standard unit of energy.
Richard Pankhurst, barrister, husband of Emmeline Pankhurst and father to Adela Pankhurst, Christabel Pankhurst and Sylvia Pankhurst is buried alongside his parents.
Rev John Relly Beard.

References

Areas of Greater Manchester
Geography of Trafford
Sale, Greater Manchester